James K. Makubuya (born in Gayaza, Wakiso District, Uganda) is a Ugandan-born ethnomusicologist, instrumentalist, singer, dancer, and choreographer.  He plays several traditional instruments from various parts of Uganda, including the endongo (8-string bowl lyre) and adungu (9-string bow harp), endingidi (1-string tube fiddle), amadinda (12-slab log xylophone), akogo (lamellaphone), and engoma (drums).
Makubuya was born in the town of Gayaza (located 30 km from Kampala, near Lake Victoria, in the Buganda region of Uganda), and is a member of the Baganda ethnic group. He holds a B.A. in music and English literature from Makerere University in Kampala, Uganda (1980); a Master of Music degree in Western music and music education from Catholic University of America in Washington D.C. (1988), and a Ph.D. in ethnomusicology from the University of California, Los Angeles (1995).

His main research focuses on organological studies in which has written many scholarly papers, including a comparative study of East African bowl lyres, bow harps, and tube fiddles.

He has taught at the Massachusetts Institute of Technology (1996-2000), where he founded the ensemble MITCAN, and is currently an Associate Professor of Music at Wabash College in Crawfordsville, Indiana, where he directs the WAMIDAN ensemble.

Makubuya performs in a cross-cultural duo with Chinese pipa performer Wu Man.  His Abadongo, for endongo, mbuutu, and string quartet was performed at the University of California by the composer and the Kronos Quartet.

He has recorded three solo CDs and appears as a guest artist on a fourth (Wu Man and Friends, 2005). His music has also been featured in several films, including Mississippi Masala (1991).

Writings
Makubuya, James (1995). "Endongo: The Role and Significance of the Baganda Bowl Lyre of Uganda." Los Angeles, California: University of California, Los Angeles. Ph.D. dissertation.

Discography
1993 - The Uganda Tropical Beat I
1989 - African Odyssey (Music of the World)
1998 - Taata Wange
2000 - Watik, Watik: Music from Uganda. Music of the World
2005 - Wu Man and Friends. Traditional Crossroads.

External links
James Makubuya page

Ugandan musicians
Ugandan emigrants to the United States
Year of birth missing (living people)
Living people
Ethnomusicologists
UCLA School of the Arts and Architecture alumni
Montgomery County, Indiana
Wabash College faculty
Massachusetts Institute of Technology faculty
Catholic University of America alumni